Phyllophaga obsoleta is a species of scarab beetle in the family Scarabaeidae. It is found in Central America, North America, and South America.

Subspecies
These three subspecies belong to the species Phyllophaga obsoleta:
 Phyllophaga obsoleta obsoleta
 Phyllophaga obsoleta vanalleri (Schaeffer, 1927)
 Phyllophaga obsoleta vanelleri

References

Further reading

 

Melolonthinae
Articles created by Qbugbot
Beetles described in 1851